The Plaza Site is an archaeological site near Ochopee, Florida. It is located in the Big Cypress National Preserve. On May 28, 1986, it was added to the U.S. National Register of Historic Places.

References

 Collier County listings at National Register of Historic Places
 Florida's Office of Cultural and Historical Programs
 Collier County listings
 Plaza Site

National Register of Historic Places in Big Cypress National Preserve
Archaeological sites in Florida
National Register of Historic Places in Collier County, Florida